Nanjing tram is the tram system of Nanjing city in the province Jiangsu of the China. There are two lines which are not connected to each other.

The Nanjing tram is a wireless system, powered by lightweight Li-ion batteries. Batteries are charged via a pantograph at stations and terminals, and dynamically during acceleration. Charging time is 46 seconds at stations, and 10 minutes at terminals. 90% of the line is catenary-free.

Lines
Hexi trams opened on 13 August 2014. Qilin trams began test runs on 10 October 2016.

Hexi trams

The starting point of the Hexi tram line is located at the Nanjing Metro Line 2 Olympic Stadium East station. Transfer is available to Nanjing Metro Line 2 and Line 10 at Yuantong.

Qilin trams 

There are 13 stations; one of them is elevated, while the rest are surface-level.

Stations

See also
 Nanjing Metro

References

Transport in Nanjing
Railway lines opened in 2014
Nanjing
2014 establishments in China
Nanjing